Isabelle Weidemann (born July 18, 1995) is a Canadian speed skater. She is a multiple Olympic medallist, winning gold in the team pursuit, silver in the 5,000 metre, and bronze in the 3,000 metre at the 2022 Winter Olympics. She is the third Canadian ever to have won more than two medals at a single Winter Olympic Games following Cindy Klassen and Gaétan Boucher. Weidemann also previously won a silver and bronze medal at the 2021 and 2020 World Single Distance Championships in women's team pursuit.

Career
Weidemann's first competition for the Canadian national team was during the 2014 World Junior Speed Skating Championships. She began competing in her first full senior season during the 2015-16 World Cup competition. At the 2015 World Single Distance Speed Skating Championships she placed fifth in the 5,000 m, indicating the success she may have in the long-distance events in her career. Weidemann won her first World Cup medals when she won a pair of bronze medals as part of the team pursuit in the fall of the 2017-18 World Cup season. Weidemann was named to Canada's 2018 Olympic team where she finished seventh and sixth respectively in the 3,000 m and 5,000 m events in her first Olympic competition. 

Following the Olympics, during the 2018-19 World Cup season, she began to find individual success, finishing on the podium several times, including one gold medal. The following season, she finished second overall in the World Cup standings for long-distance events and had two gold medal wins. Weidemann also won a bronze medal as part of the team pursuit with Ivanie Blondin and Valérie Maltais at the 2020 World Single Distance Speed Skating Championships. The trio of Canadian speed skaters would continue success together the following season, winning both World Cup events and winning silver at the 2021 World Single Distance Speed Skating Championships taking place during a pandemic shortened season.

2022 Winter Olympics
In January 2022, Weidemann was named to Canada's 2022 Olympic team She won Canada's first medal of the games, a bronze, in the 3000 metres event. This was the first medal for Canadian female speed skaters since the 2010 Winter Olympics when Kristina Groves won bronze in the same distance. After winning the medal she told Canadian media that "It's pretty surreal right now, I'm pretty emotional. But I'm very excited." Weidemann would later win the silver medal in the 5000 metres event. Weidemann also won the gold medal in the team pursuit event. Due to her successes at the games, Weidemann was named as the closing ceremony flagbearer.

References

External links

1995 births
Living people
Canadian female speed skaters
Olympic speed skaters of Canada
Speed skaters at the 2018 Winter Olympics
Speed skaters at the 2022 Winter Olympics
Medalists at the 2022 Winter Olympics
Olympic medalists in speed skating
Olympic gold medalists for Canada
Olympic silver medalists for Canada
Olympic bronze medalists for Canada
Sportspeople from Ottawa
World Single Distances Speed Skating Championships medalists
21st-century Canadian women